Hendrik Bonmann (born 22 January 1994) is a German professional footballer who plays as a goalkeeper for Austrian Bundesliga club Wolfsberger AC.

Career
On 23 May 2022, Bonmann signed a two-year contract with an option for an additional season with Austrian Bundesliga club Wolfsberger AC, after his contract with recently relegated Regionalliga Bayern club Würzburger Kickers had expired.

References

External links
 
 

Living people
1994 births
German footballers
German expatriate footballers
Footballers from Essen
Association football goalkeepers
Rot-Weiss Essen players
Borussia Dortmund II players
Borussia Dortmund players
TSV 1860 Munich players
Würzburger Kickers players
Wolfsberger AC players
3. Liga players
Regionalliga players
Oberliga (football) players
Austrian Football Bundesliga players
Expatriate footballers in Austria
German expatriate sportspeople in Austria